is a passenger railway station located in the city of Matsuyama, Ehime Prefecture, Japan. It is operated by the private transportation company Iyotetsu.

Lines 
During most of the day, trains arrive every fifteen minutes. Trains continue from Matsuyama City Station on the Takahama Line to Takahama Station.

Layout 
The station consists of one island platform with the station building located on the end of the platform, so that passengers must first exit the ticket gates before crossing the track via a level crossing. The station is attended.

History 
It was renamed  on 1 March 1927; however, the kanji for "Iyo" in its name was changed to hiragana in 1981.

Surrounding area 
Matsuyama Kyowa Hospital
Minamimatsuyama Hospital

See also 
 List of railway stations in Japan

References

External links 

Iyotetsu Station Information

Iyotetsu Yokogawara Line
Railway stations in Ehime Prefecture
Railway stations in Japan opened in 1893
Railway stations in Matsuyama, Ehime